Michał Kazimierz Heller (born 12 March 1936) is a Polish professor of philosophy at the Pontifical University of John Paul II in Kraków, Poland, and an adjunct member of the Vatican Observatory staff.

He also serves as a lecturer in the philosophy of science and logic at the Theological Institute in Tarnów. A Catholic priest belonging to the Diocese of Tarnów, Heller was ordained in 1959. In 2008 he received the Templeton Prize for his works in the field of philosophy.

Career

Michał Heller attended high school in Mościce, graduated from the Catholic University of Lublin, where he earned a master's degree in philosophy in 1965 and a Ph.D. in cosmology in 1966.

After beginning his teaching career at Tarnów, he joined the faculty of the Pontifical Academy of Theology in 1972 and was appointed to a full professorship in 1985. He has been a visiting professor at the Catholic University of Louvain in Belgium and a visiting scientist at Belgium's University of Liège, the University of Oxford, the University of Leicester, Ruhr University in Germany, The Catholic University of America, and the University of Arizona among others.

His current research is concerned with the singularity problem in general relativity and the use of noncommutative geometry in seeking the unification of general relativity and quantum mechanics into quantum gravity. His model gives new perspectives on quantum entanglement and the EPR paradox.

Awards

Templeton Prize

In March 2008, Heller was awarded the $1.6 million (£820,000) Templeton Prize for his extensive philosophical and scientific probing of "big questions". His works have sought to reconcile the "known scientific world with the unknowable dimensions of God". On receiving the Templeton Prize, Heller said:

Heller used the prize money to establish the Copernicus Center for Interdisciplinary Studies – an institute named after Nicholas Copernicus aimed at research and popularisation of science and philosophy. Heller himself is the director of the Center, as well as the program director of Copernicus Festival.

Other distinctions 

Honorary degrees from:

 AGH University of Science and Technology (1996)
 Cardinal Stefan Wyszyński University in Warsaw (2009)
 University of Life Sciences in Poznań (2010)
 Warsaw University of Technology (2012)
 Jagiellonian University (2012)
 University of Life Sciences in Lublin (2014)
 University of Silesia in Katowice (2015)
 Pontifical University of John Paul II (2016)
 Rzeszów University of Technology (2018)
Other distinctions:
 Cross of Merit (Poland) (2006)
 Order of Polonia Restituta (2009)
 Order of the White Eagle (Poland) (2014)

Memberships 
 Polish Academy of Learning
 Pontifical Academy of Sciences
 European Physical Society
 International Astronomical Union
 International Society on General Relativity and Gravitation
 International Society for the Study of Time
 International Society for Science and Religion

Further reading

Michael Heller has published nearly 200 scientific papers, not only in general relativity and relativistic cosmology, but also in philosophy, history of science and theology. He authored more than 50 books. In his volume, Is Physics an Art? (Biblos, 1998), he writes about mathematics as the language of science and also explores such humanistic issues as beauty as a criterion of truth, creativity, and transcendence.

Books – Physics and Cosmology 
The Science of Space-Time, with Derek Jeffrey Raine, Pachart Publishing House, Tucson 1981, 
Encountering the Universe, Pachart Publishing House, Tucson 1982, 
Questions to the Universe – Ten Lectures on the Foundations of Physics and Cosmology, Pachart Publishing House, Tucson 1986, 
Theoretical Foundations of Cosmology – Introduction to the Global Structure of Space-Time, World Scientific, Singapore–London 1992, 
Lemaître, Big Bang and the Quantum Universe, Pachart, Tucson 1996, 
Some Mathematical Physics for Philosophers, Pontifical Council for Culture, Pontifical Gregorian University, Vatican City–Rome 2005, 
Ultimate explanations of the universe, transl. by Teresa Bałuk-Ulewiczowa, Springer, 2009,

Books – Philosophy and Theology 
The World and the Word – Between Science and Religion, Pachart Publishing House, Tucson 1986, 
The New Physics and a New Theology, transl. by G. V. Coyne, T.M. Sierotowicz, Vatican Observatory Publications 1996, 
Creative Tension. Essays on Science & Religion, Templeton Foundation Press, Philadelphia–London 2003, 
A Comprehensible Universe. The Interplay of Science and Theology, with George Coyne, Springer, New York 2008, 
The Sense of Life and the Sense of the Universe, Copernicus Center Press, Cracow 2010, 
Philosophy in Science: An Historical Introduction, Springer, 2011, 
Philosophy of Chance. A cosmic fugue with a prelude and a coda, Copernicus Center Press, Cracow 2012,

Articles 
The Origins of Time, in: The Study of Time IV, ed. by J.T. Fraser, N. Lawrence, D. Park, Springer Verlag, New York–Heidelberg–Berlin 1981, pp. 90–93, 
Algebraic Self-Duality as the "Ultimate Explanation", Foundations of Science, 9, 2004, pp. 369–385

See also
 List of Christian thinkers in science
 List of Roman Catholic scientist-clerics
 Georges Lemaître, Belgian priest and cosmologist

References

External links
 Michał Heller's homepage
 An article by Stanislaw Wszołek about Heller's life and philosophy
 THE FAR-FUTURE UNIVERSE"Eschatology From A Cosmic Perspective" : Heller was a participant in this conference held November 7–9, 2000 in Rome, Italy
 Biography and selected articles at Papal Academy of Sciences
 Biography at Britannica Online
 
 Message to Monsignor Michał Heller, winner of the Templeton Prize
  New Scientist interview

1936 births
People from Tarnów
Cosmologists
Polish relativity theorists
Quantum gravity physicists
Historians of physics
Polish male writers
Polish Roman Catholic theologians
Polish Roman Catholic priests
Members of the Pontifical Academy of Sciences
Catholic University of America faculty
University of Arizona faculty
Catholic clergy scientists
Academics of the University of Leicester
Living people
Catholic philosophers
Philosophers of physics
Templeton Prize laureates
Theistic evolutionists
21st-century Polish philosophers
20th-century Polish philosophers